Song Cinema is the second album released by Contemporary Christian artist Mark Schultz. It was released on October 17, 2001.

Track listing
All songs written by Mark Schultz, except where noted.
 "When The Mountains Fall" (Schultz, Tony Wood) - 3:50
 "Back In His Arms Again" - 4:24
 "Think of Me" (with Rachel Lampa) - 4:47
 "I Have Been There" (Schultz, Regie Hamm) - 4:05
 "Kyrie Eleison" (Steve George, John Lang, Richard Page) - 3:42
 "Holy One" (with Chris Rice) - 5:13
 "Back To You" - 3:41
 "Faith, Hope, and Love" - 4:36
 "The Time of My Life" - 5:04
 "We Are Calling You"  - 5:31

Personnel 
 Mark Schultz – lead and backing vocals 
 Jeff Roach – keyboards 
 Dan Muckala – programming (3)
 Gary Burnette – guitars
 George Cocchini – guitars
 Scott Denté – guitars
 Mark Hill – bass
 Dan Needham – drums
 Ken Lewis – percussion 
 Sam Levine – saxophones (7)
 Barry Green – trombone (7)
 Mike Haynes – trumpet (7)
 David Angell – strings 
 Monisa Angell – strings 
 David Davidson – strings
 John Catchings – strings
 Lisa Bevill – backing vocals 
 Tabitha Fair – backing vocals 
 Bonnie Keen – backing vocals 
 Rachel Lampa – backing vocals (3)
 Chris Rice – backing vocals (6)
 Nicol Sponberg – Congo language (10)
 Todd Smith – Congo language (10)

Production 
 Producer – Monroe Jones 
 Executive Producer – Brad O’Donnell
 Engineer – Jim Dineen
 Assistant Engineers – Doug DeLong and Steve Short 
 Recorded at The Bennett House, Dark Horse Recording Studio, The Spank Factory and Screaming Baby (Franklin, TN).
 Mixing – Shane D. Wilson (Tracks 1, 2, 4-8 & 10); Tom Laune (Track 3); Jim Dineen (Track 9).
 Mixed at The Castle and Bridgeway Studios (Franklin, TN); Sound Stage Studios and Charlie Peacock Productions (Nashville, TN).
 Mastered by Bob Ludwig at Gateway Mastering (Portland, ME).
 Production Coordinator – Jamie Kiner
 Art Direction and Design – Kevin Tucker
 Photography – Robert Sebree
 Grooming – Lisa Fanjoy
 Wardrobe – John Murphy
 Management – Creative Trust

Singles

Music video
This CD features the song "I Have Been There." This song is the first music video Mark Schultz featured in.

The video starts with Mark playing the piano in a mansion. The scene then changes to a young married couple in a car holding their new baby girl. The couple worries they won't have the money to raise the child. They then pray to God saying all they have to give to the child is love. God then comforts them by saying he's been there, and has dealt with fear.

The next scene is at a church, where a pastor looks troubled, because most people are straying away from God by not going to Mass. The pastor prays to God saying he doesn't understand what's happening. God responds saying he's been there, and he's dealt with pain.

The last scene is at a cemetery, where an elderly man is dropping flowers off at his deceased wife's grave. The man then prays to God saying he loved his wife until the end. He then hears God saying he'll see her again.

The song then ends with Mark Schultz singing the chorus:
I have been there. I know what sorrow is all about. Yes, I have been there, and I am standing with you now. I have been there, and I came to build a bridge so this road could lead you home
Oh I have been there.

References

Mark Schultz (musician) albums
2001 albums